The following is a list of awards, honors, and nominations received by American actor Ke Huy Quan. For his performance in the 2022 science fiction comedy-drama film Everything Everywhere All at Once, Quan garnered critical acclaim and many accolades, including an Academy Award, a Golden Globe Award, an Independent Spirit Award, two Screen Actors Guild Awards, and a BAFTA nomination.

Quan is one of two actors of Asian descent to win an Academy Award for Best Supporting Actor, the other being Haing S. Ngor in 1985. He also became the first Vietnam-born actor in history to win an Oscar. Quan was the first Asian man to win any individual category at the Screen Actors Guild Awards, as well as the first Vietnamese-American actor to be nominated in the supporting category.

Major industry awards

Academy Awards

BAFTA Awards

Golden Globe Awards

Independent Spirit Awards

Screen Actors Guild Awards

Critics' awards

Other awards and nominations

Honors

References

External links
  

Quan, Ke Huy